Egremont Castle is located in the town of Egremont, Cumbria.

History
The original castle was built on a mound above the River Ehen on the site of a Danish fort following the conquest of Cumberland in 1092 by William II of England. The present castle was built by William Meschin, who founded the castle between 1120 and 1135. Further additions were made in the 13th century. It eventually fell into disuse and became the ruin it is today.

The castle provided protection for the town which William also created. The long wide street provided a marketplace for traders, who were granted privileges and given security in return for payment of tolls. Some of the profits were undoubtedly used by this founding father of Egremont in the foundation of St Bees Priory, dedicated to Saint Bega, at St Bees on the Cumbrian coast.

The castle is of Motte-and-bailey design.

It is said to have once possessed a horn which only the rightful heir could blow. The legend was the subject of William Wordsworth's poem The Horn of Egremont Castle.

In popular culture
An idealised view of the castle (as a painting in progress) appears as a detail on the cover of The Big Lad in the Windmill, the 1986 debut album by the band It Bites (three-quarters of whom grew up in Egremont).

See also

Grade I listed buildings in Cumbria
Listed buildings in Egremont, Cumbria

Sources

External links

Visit Cumbria
Fry, P.S. The David & Charles Book of Castles, David & Charles, London, 1980. 

12th-century establishments in England
12th-century fortifications
Castles in Cumbria
Ruins in Cumbria
Grade I listed buildings in Cumbria
Egremont, Cumbria
William II of England